Col de la Vanoise is a mountain pass of Savoie, France. It lies in the Massif de la Vanoise range. It has an elevation of 2,522 metres above sea level.

Vanoise
Vanoise